Glen Rose School District  is a public school district based in Glen Rose, Arkansas, United States, with a Malvern postal address. The school district supports more than 950 students in prekindergarten through grade 12 and employs more than 145 faculty and staff on a full time equivalent basis. The school district encompasses  of land, in Saline County and in Hot Spring County. In the former it includes the community of Traskwood.

Schools 
Each of the schools are accredited by the Arkansas Department of Education (ADE) and the elementary and high schools are accredited by AdvancED.

 Glen Rose High School, serving more than 300 students in grades 9 through 12.
 Glen Rose Middle School, serving more than 300 students in grades 5 through 8.
 Glen Rose Elementary School, serving more than 350 students in prekindergarten through grade 4.

References

External links

 

Education in Hot Spring County, Arkansas
Education in Saline County, Arkansas
School districts in Arkansas